Farriseidet is a moraine located in the northwestern part of the town center of Larvik, Norway. It separates Larvikfjorden from the lake of Farris.

Larvik